Da Bidness is an album released by the Bay Area rappers, PSD, Keak da Sneak and Messy Marv. It was released on February 13, 2007, for Thizz Entertainment, SMC Recordings and Gateway Records and was produced by the prominent Bay Area producers Traxamillion, Droop-E, Rick Rock, Jake and the Phatman as well as PSD himself, Clipto, Indo & Fireworks, Lev Berlak, Tha Rolla and Don Juan. The collaboration proved successful and charted on three Billboard charts, peaking at #82 on the Top R&B/Hip-Hop Albums, #40 on the Independent Albums chart and #12 on the Top Heatseekers. Two singles were released from the album, "Cus, Cus" and "That Go", though neither made it to the charts. Various other Bay Area rappers contributed to the album including E-40 and San Quinn.

Track listing

Personnel 
Lev Berlak – producer, mixing
The Will Bronson Chorus – A&R
Don Juan – producer
Indo – producer
Monte "Montrock" Malone – production co-ordination
Jason Moss – mixing
Rick Rock – producer

2007 albums
PSD (rapper) albums
Keak da Sneak albums
Messy Marv albums
Albums produced by Jake One
Albums produced by Rick Rock
Albums produced by Droop-E
SMC Recordings albums
Thizz Entertainment albums